Erin Burnett OutFront is an hour-long television news program hosted by Erin Burnett on CNN. The show premiered on October 3, 2011 in the 7:00pm time slot to replace John King, USA. Until the launch of CNN Tonight in 2014, OutFront was also rebroadcast at 11:00 p.m. ET, occasionally aired live during rolling coverage of breaking news. CNN said in 2011 they hoped Burnett's expected popularity would provide an "attractive" opening to an evening of "talk shows and news analysis".

OutFront is broadcast live from CNN's Hudson Yards studios in New York City or on location from the site of breaking news events.  Although the programme airs normally from 7:00pm to 8:00pm ET weekdays, it may air at other times of the day or on weekends as events warrant.

From Monday, February, 13 to Friday, February 17, 2023, an additional hour of OutFront was added at 9:00pm ET on weekdays replacing the second hour of Anderson Cooper 360°.

International broadcast

CNN International
From January 2015 until March 2020, OutFront had a repackaged thirty-minute format running on the weekends on CNN International.

As part of CNN International's schedule changes due to the COVID-19 pandemic, OutFront is now aired in its full hour-long format on weekdays, replacing the second hour of Your World Today.

CNN Philippines
From March 17 to May 29, 2015, OutFront aired in a full-hour slot at 5:00-6:00 pm local time as a pre-program to CNN Philippines Network News. To make way for a 5:45 pm slot for CNN Philippines Traffic Center, the show aired in a truncated 45-minute slot, serving as Traffic Centers pre-programming from June 2, 2015, to February 12, 2016. On February 16, OutFront moved to an earlier timeslot at 2:00 pm local time and returned to a full-hour slot.

From August to September 2016, OutFront moved to 8:30 am local time, and was reduced to 30 minutes as part of the network's program restructuring. When breaking news warranted, the timeslot (7:00 am local time) was temporarily replaced by a simulcast of CNN International. OutFront is now watchable only on paid television in the Philippines.

References

External links 

 Official Website

CNN original programming
2011 American television series debuts
2010s American television talk shows
2020s American television talk shows
2010s American television news shows
2020s American television news shows
English-language television shows